Läsna is a village in Kadrina Parish, Lääne-Viru County, in northeastern Estonia.

In 1977, Pikassaare (Pikasaare) and Reiemäe village was merged with Läsna. Toponym "Pikasaare" is still in use and it is notable for orienteering. For example, the final of 2016 World Masters Orienteering Championships took place there.

References

Villages in Lääne-Viru County